Muhammad Rizky Yusuf Nasution (born 16 July 1997) is an Indonesian professional footballer who plays as a midfielder for Liga 2 club Putra Delta Sidoarjo. A product of Persiraja youth system in 2016, he rejoined Persiraja from Persika during 2018 mid season transfer windows in August 2018. In 2017, he played for Borneo F.C. in Liga 1.

Club career

Persijap Jepara
Nasution signed with Persijap Jepara to play in the Indonesian Liga 2 for the 2020 season. This season was suspended on 27 March 2020 due to the COVID-19 pandemic. The season was abandoned and was declared void on 20 January 2021.

Persiraja Banda Aceh
He was signed for Persiraja Banda Aceh to play in the Liga 1 in the 2021 season. Nasution made his league debut on 7 January 2022 in a match against PSS Sleman at the Ngurah Rai Stadium, Denpasar.

References

1997 births
Living people
Indonesian footballers
Association football midfielders
Persiraja Banda Aceh players
Sportspeople from Aceh